Ernst Simon Glaser (born 1975 in Ålesund, Norway) is a Norwegian musician (cello) and music teacher, the son of violinist Ernst Glaser (1904–79), and brother of the pianist Liv Glaser (1935–).

Biography 
Glaser moved to England at the age of six years, and got his musical exams at the Royal Northern College of Music in Manchester. In 2002 he was awarded This year's Young Soloist by the Rikskonsertene, and he gave a remarkable debut concert at the University Concert Hall in Oslo 2003. He received the Debutantprisen 2004, and has been appointed as alternate solo cellist in the Trondheim Symphony Orchestra and The Norwegian Opera and Ballet for ten years, and is currently principal cellist at the Gothenburg Symphony Orchestra. In 2014 he started as teacher at the Norwegian Academy of Music together with the cellist Truls Mørk. He has toured extensively in areas like Europe and Asia, and is performing Olav Anton Thommessen among others, at Siljustøl during Festspillene i Bergen 2015.

Discography 
2004: Schubert & Schumann (Simax Classics)
2012: Zvezdochka in Orbit (Aurora Records)

References

External links 

40 søskenår ingen hindring Celebrating Ernst Glaser's 100 years anniversary. Aftenposten 

1975 births
Living people
Musicians from Ålesund
Norwegian Jews
Norwegian cellists
Alumni of the Royal Northern College of Music
Academic staff of the Norwegian Academy of Music
Norwegian expatriates in the United Kingdom
Norwegian expatriates in Sweden